James Michael Curtis (March 27, 1943 – April 20, 2020) was an American professional football player for the Baltimore Colts, the Seattle Seahawks and the Washington Redskins, who played 14 seasons from 1965 to 1978 in the National Football League (NFL). He was a four-time Pro Bowler in 1968, 1970, 1971 and 1974. Although sacks were not official during the time he played, Curtis was a good blitzer, recording 22 sacks, including one in which a famous photograph was taken of Curtis tackling Roman Gabriel's head. Curtis also picked off 25 passes and was named the AFC Defensive Player of the Year in 1970 by a panel of 101 sportswriters.

Early career 
Curtis went to Richard Montgomery High School in Rockville, Maryland, and was a 195-pound fullback as a junior in 1959. He played college football at Duke University, where he was a two-time All-Atlantic Coast Conference selection as well Academic All American. At Duke Mike was a member of Phi Delt fraternity.

Career

Curtis was drafted as a fullback in the first round of the 1965 NFL Draft by the Colts, but later switched to linebacker on the weak side (away from the tight end). He was a team captain for most of his Baltimore career. In 1970, he had five interceptions and that same season made a key pickoff that set up the game-winning field goal in the Colts' Super Bowl V win over the Dallas Cowboys with just 59 seconds left in the game. He and Ted Hendricks, member of the Pro Football Hall of Fame, formed a potent tandem at the linebacker position from 1969 to 1973, after which Hendricks was traded. Curtis was named the Colts' Most Valuable Player in 1974.

Curtis' 1975 season was cut short on November 12 when he opted for surgery to repair cartilage in his left knee which he had injured in a preseason game in early September. Despite the objections of head coach Ted Marchibroda, Curtis was left unprotected for the 1976 NFL Expansion Draft due to a personality conflict with general manager Joe Thomas. "I heard indirectly that I was in the expansion draft because Joe Thomas hated my guts," he said. "Thomas could have had a first-round draft choice or better for me if he had wanted it."

Curtis was selected by the Seattle Seahawks. He started all 14 regular-season games during the Seahawks' inaugural campaign and was one of the team's cocaptains. After being supplanted by Ken Geddes on the depth chart prior to the start of the 1977 season, he was waived by the Seahawks on September 6. He signed with the Washington Redskins three days later on September 9. He started 11 games in place of the injured Chris Hanburger in 1977, but only two of the 13 contests in which he played the following year. His intention to retire after the 1979 season was expedited before the campaign began when he was released by the Redskins on August 7.

Writing 

In 1972 Curtis wrote one book about his career, titled Keep Off My Turf, in which he states that the New York Jets, who upset the Colts in Super Bowl III, "were lucky that day," and that the 1968 Colts were "twice as good as the Jets."

In 2017 Curtis wrote the foreword for The First 50 Super Bowls: How Football's Championships Were Won by author Ed Benkin.

Personal life
Curtis had three children, Clay, Ryan and Caitlin. As of 2019, he had seven grandchildren. Curtis died on April 20, 2020, in St. Petersburg, Florida. He died from complications from chronic traumatic encephalopathy (CTE), a neurodegenerative disease caused by repeated head injuries.

References

External links
 

1943 births
2020 deaths
Sportspeople from Rockville, Maryland
Players of American football from Maryland
American football linebackers
Duke Blue Devils football players
Baltimore Colts players
Seattle Seahawks players
Washington Redskins players
Western Conference Pro Bowl players
American Conference Pro Bowl players
Writers from Maryland